"Satish" is a song by American rapper Tee Grizzley, released on September 20, 2019, as the lead single from his album The Smartest, through the label Grizzley Gang Music Group.

Background
On August 20, 2019, Tee Grizzley's aunt and manager, Jobina Satish Brown was murdered in Detroit, Michigan when a gunman approached Grizzley's car and opened fire. Brown was sitting in the back seat. The name of the song, "Satish", comes from Brown's middle name.
Throughout the song, Grizzley raps about his grief for the loss of his aunt and expresses his anger towards her killer.

Charts

Certifications

References

2019 singles
2019 songs
Tee Grizzley songs